This is the results breakdown of the local elections held in Extremadura on 26 May 2019. The following tables show detailed results in the autonomous community's most populous municipalities, sorted alphabetically.

Opinion polls

City control
The following table lists party control in the most populous municipalities, including provincial capitals (shown in bold). Gains for a party are displayed with the cell's background shaded in that party's colour.

Municipalities

Almendralejo
Population: 33,468

Badajoz
Population: 150,530

Cáceres
Population: 96,068

Mérida
Population: 59,352

Plasencia
Population: 40,141

See also
2019 Extremaduran regional election

References

Extremadura
2019